The Piedra Lumbre Formation is a geologic formation that crops out in the Picuris Mountains of northern New Mexico. Detrital zircon geochronology yields a maximum age of 1475 million years, corresponding to the Calymmian period.

Description
The Piedra Lumbre Formation consists of light gray to black phyllite or schist. The formation has been subject to extreme deformation within the Hondo syncline that confuses the stratigraphic picture.

This is characterized by light gray crenulated cleavage surfaces sprinkled with small garnet, biotite, and staurolite crystals. The middle member is interbedded light gray schist and quartzite, with the top  primarily black phyllitic schist with white banding. The quartzite beds towards the base of this member contain thin calcareous beds.

Detrital zircon geochronology yields a maximum age of 1475 Mya, similar to the underlying Pilar Formation but considerably younger than the lower Hondo Group. This suggests that the Pilar Formation and Piedra Lumbre Formation should be removed from the Hondo Group and provides evidence supporting the Picuris orogeny.

History of investigation
The unit was originally mapped as part of the Rinconada Schist Member of the Ortega Formation by Arthur Montgomery in 1958., which it resembles except for having less abundant garnet. Nielsen recognized in 1972 that the beds were distinct from the upper Rinconada Schist but erroneously assigned them to the Pilar Formation. Long assigned these beds to the Piedra Lumbre Formation in 1976, naming the unit after the Cañada de Piedra Lumbre.

Footnotes

References
 
 
 
 
 Nielsen, K. C., 1972, Structural evolution of the Picuris Mountains, New Mexico: Chapel Hill, N. C., University of North Carolina M.S. thesis.

Precambrian formations of New Mexico